Lake Cypress Springs is a  reservoir in northeast Texas, approximately  east of Dallas, Texas. The lake is used for recreational, municipal, and industrial purposes. The lake is regularly monitored by a lake patrol, which enforces wake zones, fishing licenses, boat dock rules, and boating. Lake Cypress Springs has 20 subdivisions and around 850 waterfront homes. In 2011, Lake Cypress Springs was rated one of "The 10 Best Lakes to Call Home" according to D Magazine.

History
Authorization was given on 10 November 1966 to construct the dam, originally designed to impound  of water. The dam was built by the Vibig Construction Company of Dallas, Texas, with construction starting on 1 July 1968. Construction was finished on the dam on 15 February 1971. An emergency spillway exists at the north end of the dam to assist during major floods. The dam cost US$1,340,126 in 1969.

Lake
Originally, the lake was to be known as Big Cypress Creek Lake during dam construction, and later was known as Lake Franklin County until it was officially changed to Lake Cypress Springs on 2 April 1971. W. R. Boyd, Inc. was responsible for clearing the woody land beneath the lake today to help make Lake Cypress Springs a recreational lake at a cost of US$194,740. The original basin of the lake consisted almost entirely of covered vegetation along the Big Cypress Creek. This made clearing the basin an important task not only to make the lake a recreational one, but also allow the lake to be navigable via boat, due to the shallow nature of the lake. Various roads, such as FM 115 had to be rerouted to allow traffic to still flow through the county.

In 2014, construction finished on Phase 3a of the Keystone Pipeline which passes within  of the west end of the lake. On 27 December 2015, torrential rains caused the lake to rise to all-time highs. During this time, all watercraft were prohibited from operating on the lake. During the high water event,  was moved through the lake in a day to alleviate the effects of the flooding. Yearly, there is a fireworks show around the 4th of July from Mary King Park. An estimated 20,000 people watched the show in 2009, with many viewing from their boats on the lake.

Ecology
According to the most recent core samples taken in 2007 from Lake Cypress Springs, the lake has a primarily sand and clay bottom.

Parks
Lake Cypress Springs is home to six parks, Walleye Park, Twin Oaks Park, Guthrie Park, Overlook Park, Dogwood Park, and Mary King Park. Several locations allow for primitive camping and RV camping. The parks are maintained by the Franklin County Water District. Rates are $10 and $25 throughout the year for primitive camping and tent sites, respectively. RV sites cost between $25 - $50 depending on the season and park. There are an average of 18 parking spaces available at each park.

Vegetation
Since 2006, Lake Cypress Springs is one of the few lakes in East Texas that does not have invasive hydrilla, thanks to Triploid Grass Carp stocked in 1997 and 2006, making it ideal for recreational activities, such as swimming. Hydrilla was first found in the lake in the 1970s. American lotus is present at the west end of the lake thanks to the shallow water. During the first addition of grass carp, the lake experienced an increase in Lyngbia wollei algae, which can only be controlled with a decrease in nutrients. The lake is primarily surrounded by a cover of loblolly pines, which grow well in East Texas. Starting in 2003, a management project is currently underway to revitalize the natural vegetation of the lake, which includes the protection of cypress trees.

Birds
There is a wide variety of birds that can be seen around the lake. Cattle egret, American avocet, American herring gull, Red-headed woodpecker, Osprey, Northern flicker, and Buff-bellied pipit, have all been spotted around or on the lake. There is a sizable population of Wood duck, Black-bellied whistling duck, Great egret, and Great blue heron. During the winter, much of the bird activity dies down, however American white pelicans and Bald eagles can be seen throughout the season.

Fish
The lake has been stocked numerous times to attract anglers to the lake and improve the vegetation in the reservoir. A Texas-issued fishing license is required to fish on the lake.

Notes
1.Up to date as of 2015.

References

1960 establishments in Texas
Bodies of water of Franklin County, Texas
Cypress Springs